The Magic Sword (also known as St. George and the Dragon, St. George and the Seven Curses, the film's original title, and The Seven Curses of Lodac) is a 1962 American adventure fantasy film directed by Bert I. Gordon that is loosely based on the medieval legend of Saint George and the Dragon.

Plot
George is the foster son of Sybil, an elderly, somewhat ineffectual sorceress. She brought him up after his "royal parents died of the plague" in his infancy.

He has fallen in love with the Princess Helene, but she is kidnapped by the wizard Lodac, who brazenly informs her father that he intends to feed her to his pet dragon in seven days, in revenge for the death of his sister. George wants to go on a quest to liberate his lady love, but Sybil believes he is too young as he is only 20. 

She tries to distract the youth by showing him a magic sword; a steed; an invulnerable suit of armor; and six magically frozen knights that he will command when he turns 21. The impatient George tricks Sybil and locks her in a cellar. He then leaves with the magical implements in the revived company of knights.

Sir George and his party appear before the king and insist on journeying to Lodac's castle to rescue Helene. This request is done despite opposition from Sir Branton, a knight who has also volunteered for the perilous quest. The king promises the rescuer his daughter's hand in marriage and half his kingdom. Helene is forced to watch as Ladoc feeds two captive princess/sisters to his dragon.

Seven curses bar the path to Lodac's castle. First, they encounter an ogre, who slays Sir Ulrich of Germany and Sir Pedro of Spain, before George kills it. When George tries to save Sir Anthony of Italy from drowning in a magic swamp, Branton treacherously kicks him in. Anthony is dissolved and killed, but George survives with the help of his magic sword.

Later, Branton meets secretly with Lodac. Branton just so happens to have Lodac's ring, which the magician lost and wants desperately back, as his powers are crippled without it. The kidnapping was solely intended to make Branton look good in exchange for the ring. Sir Dennis of France comes by and Lodac prepares a trap involving Mignonette, a beautiful Frenchwoman, who distracts her compatriot, before turning into an ugly hag who attacks him. Fortunately, George saves him with his magic shield.

Lodac finally becomes aware that George is being aided by magic. He contacts Sybil and mocks her abilities. Stung by the criticism, she tries to cast a spell to help George, but ends up inadvertently stripping away all his magical powers.

Sir Dennis and Sir James of Scotland burn and perish from a heat spiral when they investigate  ahead. Branton then leads George and Sir Patrick of Ireland into a trap, revealing his partnership with Lodac, before sealing them in a cave with deadly green apparitions. Patrick, through the power of his faith, enables George to escape at the cost of his own life.

George sneaks into Lodac's castle and rescues Helene only to then be captured. The magician gives Helene (actually the hag in disguise) to Branton, but once he has the ring, he uses magic to put Branton's head on a plaque on the wall. George is tied up, but escapes with the help of a number of shrunken prisoners. Sybil arrives and finally remembers the spell that restores George's powers. These powers then enable him to slay the two-headed dragon and save Helene. Sybil steals the ring while Lodac is distracted. When the magician threatens the young couple with the seventh curse (himself), Sybil transforms herself into a large panther and kills him. Helene and George get married and the 6 knights are restored to life. All ends with Sybill walking away smiling while she wears Ladoc's dragon ring.

Cast

Basil Rathbone as Lodac
Estelle Winwood as Sybil
Gary Lockwood as Sir George
Anne Helm as Princess Helene
Liam Sullivan as Sir Branton
Maila Nurmi as The Hag / Sorceress
Angelo Rossitto as 2nd Dwarf
Danielle De Metz as Mignonette
Merritt Stone as The King
Jacques Gallo as Sir Dennis of France
David Cross as Sir Pedro of Spain
John Mauldin as Sir Patrick of Ireland
Taldo Kenyon as Sir Anthony of Italy
Angus Duncan as Sir James of Scotland
Leroy Johnson as Sir Ulrich of Germany (Voice by Paul Frees, uncredited)
Marlene Callahan as Princess Grace
Nick Bon Tempi as Left Siamese Twin
Paul Bon Tempi as Right Siamese Twin
Ann Graves as Princess Laura

Lorrie Richards as Anne
Jack Kosslyn as The Ogre
Ted Finn as 1st Dwarf

Production
The film was shot on the 20th Century Fox backlot and at Samuel Goldwyn Studio.

Comic book adaptation
Dell Movie Classic: The Magic Sword (September 1962)

Reception and legacy
The film appeared on a 1992 episode of Mystery Science Theater 3000. In a highly unusual admission, characters Joel Robinson and Tom Servo said the film was "pretty good for a Bert I. Gordon film" during a theater segment (though Crow T. Robot seemed to disagree). The writers of the show continued the praise in their book MST3K Amazing Colossal Episode Guide.

It was also spoofed by RiffTrax on August 14, 2015.

References

External links

Said MST3K episode on ShoutFactoryTV

United Artists films
1962 films
1960s fantasy adventure films
American sword and sorcery films
Films about Christianity
Films set in the Middle Ages
Films adapted into comics
Films about dragons
Saint George and the Dragon
American fantasy adventure films
Films directed by Bert I. Gordon
Films scored by Richard Markowitz
American films about revenge
1960s English-language films
1960s American films